

Belgium
Belgian Congo – Pierre Ryckmans, Governor-General of the Belgian Congo (1934–1946)

France
 French Somaliland – 
 Marie François Julien Pierre-Alype, Governor of French Somaliland (1937–1938)
 Hubert Jules Deschamps, Governor of French Somaliland (1938–1940)
 Guinea – 
 Pierre Tap, acting Governor of Guinea (1937–1938)
 Louis-Placide Blacher, Governor of Guinea (1938–1939)

Japan
 Karafuto – 
Takeshi Imamura, Governor-General of Karafuto (5 July 1932 – 7 May 1938)
Toshikazu Munei, Governor-General of Karafuto (7 May 1938 – 9 April 1940)
 Korea – Jirō Minami, Governor-General of Korea (1936–1942)
 Taiwan – Seizō Kobayashi, Governor-General of Taiwan (June 1936 – November 1940)

Portugal
 Angola – António Lopes Matheus, High Commissioner of Angola (1935–1939)

United Kingdom
 Malta Colony – Charles Bonham-Carter, Governor of Malta (1936–1940)
 Northern Rhodesia 
 Sir Hubert Winthrop Young, Governor of Northern Rhodesia (1935–1938)
 John Alexander Maybin, Governor of Northern Rhodesia (1938–1941)

Colonial governors
Colonial governors
1938